is a passenger railway station in the city of Takahagi, Ibaraki Prefecture, Japan, operated by East Japan Railway Company (JR East).

Lines
Takahagi Station is served by the Jōban Line, and is located 162.5 km from the official starting point of the line at Nippori Station in Tokyo.

Station layout
The station consists of has one island platform connected to the station building by a footbridge. The station has a Midori no Madoguchi staffed ticket office.

Platforms

History
The station opened on 25 February 1897. The station was absorbed into the JR East network upon the privatization of the Japanese National Railways (JNR) on 1 April 1987. A new station building was completed in March 2014.

Passenger statistics
In fiscal 2019, the station was used by an average of 2643 passengers daily (boarding passengers only).

Gallery

Surrounding area
 Takahagi Post Office

Ibaraki Prefectural Takahagi High School
Ibaraki Prefectural Takahagi Kiyomatsu High School
Takahagi City Library

See also
 List of railway stations in Japan

References

External links

 Station information JR East Station Information 

Railway stations in Ibaraki Prefecture
Jōban Line
Railway stations in Japan opened in 1897
Takahagi, Ibaraki